The 2003 San Diego State Aztecs football team represented San Diego State University in the 2003 NCAA Division I-A football season. The Aztecs, led by head coach Tom Craft, played their home games at the Qualcomm Stadium.

Schedule

References

San Diego State
San Diego State Aztecs football seasons
San Diego State Aztecs football